The Hamilton Bengals are Junior "B" box lacrosse team from Hamilton, Ontario, Canada.  The Bengals play in the OLA Junior B Lacrosse League.

History

Although not the same franchise, the Hamilton Bengals name does have some previous history.  From 1976 until 1983, the original Hamilton Bengals existed in the OLA Junior A Lacrosse League.  They moved in 1983 and are now currently known as the Burlington Chiefs.

The Bengals had an excellent first season in the OLA.  With a winning record, they finished in seventh place in the regular season to clinch a playoff spot in their first season.  Their first playoff opponent was the Niagara Thunderhawks who gave them the rookie treatment, vanquishing the Bengals in three straight games. The Bengals returned to the playoffs in 2007 but were eliminated in the first round once again.

After a 10 year wait, the Bengals returned to the playoffs in 2017 and won their first ever playoff game over the Elora Mohawks.  They would go on and win their first ever playoff series as well before falling in the second round to the Six Nations Rebels.  In 2018 the Bengals completed their best regular season ever, but fell in the first round of the playoffs to the Wallaceburg Red Devils, losing 3 games - 2.  2018 also marked team bests for goals against (149) and goals scored (211).  The Bengals Coaching Staff were selected by their peers as Jr B West Coaching Staff of the year in both 2017 and 2018

Season-by-season results

Note: GP = Games played, W = Wins, L = Losses, T = Ties, Pts = Points, GF = Goals for, GA = Goals against

External links
Bengals Webpage
The Bible of Lacrosse
Unofficial OLA Page

Ontario Lacrosse Association teams
Sports teams in Hamilton, Ontario
2006 establishments in Ontario
Lacrosse clubs established in 2006